Coors Brewers Limited, later known as Molson Coors Brewing Company (UK) Limited is the UK arm of Molson Coors Beverage Company.  Its headquarters is in Burton upon Trent, Staffordshire. The company originates from Bass Brewers Limited.  The company has gone through many name changes and mergers.

History 
The company originates from Bass Brewers Limited founded in 1777.  In 1926 Bass Brewery merged with William Worthingtons.  The company was purchased in 2000 by Interbrew and then forced to change its name due to the purchase by Coors in 2002, as Interbrew kept the name Bass.

In 2009 following the merger between Molson and Coors in 2006, Coors Brewers Limited changed its name to Molson Coors Brewing Company (UK) Ltd.  The operations in England are now part of Molson Coors Europe.

Brands 
The Company has several brands under its belt. Prominently it owns the sole contract to produce Carling in the UK; it also produces namely Coors and Doom Bar.

Brands Include:

Aspall Cyder
Blue Moon
Caffreys
Carling
Carling Premier
Carling Cider
Cobra
Coors
Franciscan Well
Hop Stuff
Madri Excepcional (collaboration with La Sagra brewery)
Miller Genuine Draft
Mitchells and Butlers Brew XI
Mitchells and Butlers Mild
Molson Canadian
Pravha
Staropramen
Stones Bitter
Sharp's
Three Fold Hard Seltzer
Worthington Bitter
Worthington E
Worthington White Shield

The company imports / distributes:

Bavaria
Bavaria 0.0
Bodega Bay Hard Seltzer
Rekorderlig Cider

Sites 

The UK arm of the company has three main sites: Burton Brewery containing an additional maltings facility (formerly AllBrew's Maltings), which is currently out of action and Tadcaster Brewery. Burton is the largest site followed by Tadcaster. Shobnall Maltings provides the malt for all their UK sites and many other breweries in the UK. Also Burton Brewery houses the National Brewery Centre (formerly Coors Visitor Centre); within the museum complex is the White Shield Brewery, this brews all special and limited run beers and also is the sole production site for Worthington White Shield.

The company has the capacity to turn the barley into malt, and brew, bottle, can, keg and cask beer.

The Company currently the 5th largest brewer in the world with a 20% market share has recently bought out the majority share in Cobra, and is running contracts for Scottish & Newcastle and Magners Cider.

Internet Operations

Coors Brewers offer their customers the option of ordering online through two websites; barbox.com and coorsdirect.com. barbox.com was formerly owned by Coors Brewers in a partnership with Scottish & Newcastle before being acquired by iTradeNetwork. iTradeNetwork now provide the online ordering facilities for Molson Coors through barbox.com and coorsdirect.com

References

External links 
 Molson Coors Brewing Company (UK)

Breweries in England
Companies based in Burton upon Trent
Molson Coors Beverage Company